Calandrella is a genus of larks in the family Alaudidae.

Taxonomy and systematics
The genus Calandrella was established by the German naturalist Johann Jakob Kaup in 1829 with the greater short-toed lark as the type species. The genus name is a diminutive of Ancient Greek kalandros, the calandra lark. Four of the species in the genus use the shortened name of short-toed lark as an alternate name.

Extant species
Six species are recognized in the genus:

Extinct species
At least one fossil species is included in this genus:
 †Calandrella gali (late Miocene of Polgardi, Hungary)

Former species
Some authorities have classified the following species as belonging to the genus Calandrella:
 Buckley's lark (as Calandrella buckleyi)
 Obbia lark (as Calandrella obbiensis)
 Sclater's lark (as Calandrella sclateri)
 Stark's lark (as Calandrella starki)
 Masked lark (as Calandrella personata)
 Botha's lark (as Calandrella fringillaris)
 Pink-billed Lark (as Calandrella conirostris)
 Raso lark (as Calandrella razae)
 Athi short-toed lark (as Calandrella athensis)
 Asian short-toed lark (as Calandrella cheleensis)
 Kazakhstan lesser short-toed lark (as Calandrella leucophaea)
 Somali short-toed lark (as Calandrella somalica)
 Sand lark (as Calandrella raytal)

References

 
Bird genera
Taxa named by Johann Philipp Achilles Leisler
Taxonomy articles created by Polbot